Valea Sasului may refer to:

 Valea Sasului, a village in Șona commune, Alba County, Romania
 Valea Sasului, a village in Cozma commune, Mureș County, Romania

See also 
 Valea Sasului River (disambiguation)